Indigo Child is the debut mixtape by American singer Raury. It was released for free on August 25, 2014, by Columbia Records.

Critical reception

Scott Simpson of Exclaim! commented about Raury's musicianship throughout the mixtape, "His ideas may be undercooked, and his lyrics youthful if not outright immature, but he has a masterful command of his sound, even if it can't be defined just yet", concluding that an executive producer should be able to direct his raw artistry in the right direction. Pitchfork writer Corbin Goble called it "a perfect introduction to Raury's style-sampling aesthetic, as well as the blizzard of sometimes-undercooked ideas he brings on the table", concluding that "Overall, Indigo Child is an intriguing blueprint for Raury's talent, and watching Raury continue to put it all together going forward will definitely prove fascinating." Brian Josephs from Consequence of Sound commended Raury's cohesive, multi-genre experimentation and earnest delivery but criticized the teenager's perspective in the songs for contributing to underwritten lyricism and poor pacing, concluding that the mixtape is marginally listenable due to Raury's musical artistry containing potential for better future projects.

Track listing

References 

2014 mixtape albums
Raury albums
Albums produced by Take a Daytrip